Job Sikhala, nicknamed Wiwa (born 1972), is a Zimbabwean politician.
He is currently in pre-trial incarceration in the country's maximum prison on charges of inciting public violence.

Career

Sikhala is the current Deputy National Chairman of the Citizen Coalition for Change Since July 2018, he has been the member of parliament for Zengeza West. He was formerly a member of parliament for the St Mary's constituency.

Sikhala was born in the former Rhodesia, now Zimbabwe, in 1972. He graduated from Mazungunye High School in Bikita, and went on to the University of Zimbabwe, where he received a bachelor's degree in history and economic history and a law degree.  At university, he was involved with student activism.

In 1999, Sikhala joined the Movement for Democratic Change at its inception and was part of the national executive of the party. In the 2000 elections, he was elected to parliament from the St. Mary's constituency.  In the party schism of 2005, Sikhala followed Welshman Ncube and was part of the MDC–N. In 2014 Sikhala further split from the MDC-N to create the MDC 99 faction. After the reunification of the MDC in 2018, Sikhala replaced Tendai Biti as Deputy National Chairman in May 2019.

In 2019, Sikhala was charged by the Zimbabwe government with treason.  In February 2020, he was cleared of those charges.

Notes and references

1972 births
Living people
Members of the National Assembly of Zimbabwe
People acquitted of treason
Zimbabwean democracy activists